The Wengen Jungfrau is a summit of the Bernese Alps, north of the Jungfrau on the border between the Swiss cantons of Bern and Valais. Because of its small prominence it was included in the enlarged list of alpine four-thousanders.

References

External links 
 Wengen Jungfrau on Hikr
 List of Alpine four-thousanders

Alpine four-thousanders
Mountains of the Alps
Mountains of Switzerland
Mountains of Valais
Mountains of the canton of Bern
Four-thousanders of Switzerland